Iorwerth Eiddon Stephen Edwards,  (21 July 1909 – 24 September 1996) — known as I. E. S. Edwards— was an English Egyptologist and curator, considered to be a leading expert on the pyramids.

Biography
Born in London, he was the son of Edward Edwards (1870–1944) of the British Museum, and his wife Ellen Jane Higgs. He attended Merchant Taylors' School, where he studied Hebrew, and then Gonville and Caius College, Cambridge, gaining a first class in Oriental Languages. He was awarded the William Wright studentship in Arabic and received his doctorate in 1933.

In 1934 Edwards joined the British Museum as Assistant Keeper in the Department of Egyptian and Assyrian Antiquities. He published Hieroglyphic Texts for Egyptian Stelae in 1939. During World War II he was sent to Egypt on military duty. In 1946 he wrote The Pyramids of Egypt, which was published by Penguin Books in 1947. In 1955 he was appointed the Keeper of Egyptian Antiquities at the British Museum and  organized the Tutankhamun exhibition in 1972. He remained there until his retirement in 1974.

On leaving the British Museum he worked with UNESCO during the rescue of the temple complex at Philae. He was also Vice-President of the Egypt Exploration Society, a Fellow of the British Academy (1962) and was appointed a CBE in 1968 for his services to the British Museum.

Family
Edwards married Elizabeth Lisle in 1938. They had a daughter and a son.

See also
 List of Egyptologists

References

 

 
 
 
 

1909 births
1996 deaths
Alumni of Gonville and Caius College, Cambridge
Commanders of the Order of the British Empire
Employees of the British Museum
Fellows of the British Academy
English archaeologists
English Egyptologists
People educated at Merchant Taylors' School, Northwood